TKZ can refer to:
 Tifozat Kuq e Zi, supporters' association for the Albania national football team
 TKZee, South African kwaito music group
 The Korean Zombie (TKZ), nickname for Korean mixed martial artist Chan Sung Jung